"Stages" is a song by American rock band ZZ Top. It was released as the second single from their ninth studio album Afterburner (1985). It peaked at number 21 on the United States Billboard Hot 100 and topped the Billboard Hot Mainstream Rock Tracks chart for two weeks.

Reception
Cash Box called it "melodic, driving, and danceable."  Billboard called it a "rollicking" and "high-powered."

AllMusic called the song a "terrific post-new wave rocker" and that it is the poppiest thing they ever cut.

Formats and track listings
 7-inch single (United States)
 "Stages" – 3:32
 "Can't Stop Rockin'" – 3:01

 12-inch single (United States)
 "Stages" (extended version) – 5:05
 "Stages" – 3:32
 "Hi Fi Mama" – 2:22

Charts

Personnel
Credits for "Stages" adapted from Afterburner album liner notes.

 Frank Beard – drums, backing vocals
 Billy Gibbons – guitar, lead vocals
 Bill Ham – production
 Dusty Hill – bass, backing vocals

References

1986 singles
ZZ Top songs
Songs written by Frank Beard (musician)
Songs written by Dusty Hill
Songs written by Billy Gibbons
1985 songs
Warner Records singles
Song recordings produced by Bill Ham